Guy Guillabert (28 January 1931 – 4 September 2009) was a French rower who competed in the 1956 Summer Olympics.

In 1956 he was a crew member of the French boat which won the bronze medal in the coxless fours event.

External links
 Guy Guillabert's profile at Sports Reference.com

1931 births
2009 deaths
French male rowers
Olympic rowers of France
Rowers at the 1956 Summer Olympics
Olympic bronze medalists for France
Olympic medalists in rowing
Medalists at the 1956 Summer Olympics
20th-century French people